
Gmina Radzyń Podlaski is a rural gmina (administrative district) in Radzyń Podlaski County, Lublin Voivodeship, in eastern Poland. Its seat is the town of Radzyń Podlaski, although the town is not part of the territory of the gmina.

Villages
Gmina Radzyń Podlaski contains the villages and settlements of Bedlno, Bedlno Radzyńskie, Biała, Białka, Branica Radzyńska, Branica Radzyńska-Kolonia, Główne, Jaski, Marynin, Paszki Duże, Paszki Małe, Płudy, Radowiec, Siedlanów, Stasinów, Ustrzesz, Zabiele, Żabików and Zbulitów Duży.

Neighbouring gminas
Gmina Radzyń Podlaski is bordered by the town of Radzyń Podlaski and by the gminas of Borki, Czemierniki, Drelów, Kąkolewnica Wschodnia, Ulan-Majorat and Wohyń.

References
Polish official population figures 2006

Radzyn Podlaski
Radzyń Podlaski County